The Cuciurgan power station is the largest power station of Moldova, located in Dnestrovsc, Transnistria, on the shores of the Cuciurgan Reservoir bordering Ukraine. It was commissioned on 26 September 1964 and produces about 83% of Moldova's electricity.

Technical features
The power stations has installed capacity of 2,520 MW. It is fueled by natural gas, fuel oil and coal.  The plant produces some 75% of Moldova's electricity needs. 51% owned by Inter RAO UES since 2005, in November 2008, Inter RAO UES and Moldelectrica signed an agreement to separate some power units in the power station from the IPS/UPS system and synchronize them with the synchronous grid of Continental Europe in Romania through the 400 kV Kuchurhan–Vulcănești and Vulcănești–Isaccea transmission lines.

Operation
The power station is operated by Moldavskaya GRES, a 100% subsidiary of Russian owned Inter RAO UES. It is the largest power company in an area comprising Moldova and southern Ukraine. The company exports power to Ukraine, Romania and Russia. It was privatized in 2004 by Transnistrian authorities, but official Moldova does not recognize this privatization.

References

External links

Company website

Companies of Transnistria
Coal-fired power stations in Moldova
Natural gas-fired power stations in Moldova
Oil-fired power stations in Moldova
Power stations built in the Soviet Union
Inter RAO
Chimneys in Moldova
1964 establishments in the Soviet Union